1967 Coppa delle Alpi shows the results of the 1967 tournament that was held mainly in Germany and Switzerland in the preseason 1967/68. The Coppa delle Alpi (translated as Cup of the Alps) was a football tournament, jointly organized by the Italian national league and the Swiss League as a pre-season event. 

Most of the games in the 1967 competition were played in Germany and Switzerland . There were three teams taking part from Italy AC Milan, AS Roma and Torino FC, two from Germany Eintracht Frankfurt and TSV 1860 Munich as well as three from Switzerland FC Basel, Servette FC and FC Zürich The teams played in one group. Each team only played against foreign teams.

Matches

Table

Sources and References 
 Cup of the Alps 1967 at RSSSF
 Alpenpokal 1967 at eintracht-archiv.de
 Alpencup at fcb-archiv.ch
 Stagione 1966/1967 at archiviotoro.it
 Coppa delle Alpi at magliarossonera.it
 Alpencup / Coupe des Alpes at super-servette.ch

Cup of the Alps
Alps